Thaumatoptila is a genus of moths belonging to the family Tortricidae.

Species
Thaumatoptila verrucosa Diakonoff, 1984

References
tortricidae.com

Polyorthini
Tortricidae genera
Taxa named by Alexey Diakonoff